Tuba mirum is a part of the Dies irae, a Latin poetic sequence used in Anglican and Catholic liturgies, especially the Requiem Mass.

Tuba mirum may also refer to:

Musical compositions
Requiem (Berlioz)
War Requiem (Britten)
Requiem (Dvořák)
Requiem (Henze)
Requiem (Mozart)
Polish Requiem (Penderecki)
Requiem (Schnittke); see 
Requiem Canticles (Stravinsky)
Requiem (Verdi)
Messa per Rossini (a collective work by 13 composers)

Other
 A musical instrument invented by the composer and parodist Peter Schickele